The Église Notre Dame Saint-Vincent is a Roman Catholic church located in Lyon, on the banks of the Saône, quai Saint-Vincent, in the 1st arrondissement of Lyon. In 1984, it was classified as monument historique.

History
The church was built by Augustinian monks in 1759, when they were present in the area from the fourteenth century. The plans of the church were drawn by Léonard Roux. It was finally completed on 4 June 1789 by Joseph Janin, and was called Église Saint-Louis, as tribute to Louis Le Dauphin, who had contributed financially to its construction. A book called "Book of Accounts" was written to trace the entire history of the construction of the church. It took its current name in 1863.

In 1793, the church served as hospital, then warehouse and gendarmerie.

In 1933, Mortamet restored the church. In 1941, a number of Lyon Catholics, Protestants and agnostics met fortnightly in the crypt of the Église Notre Dame Saint-Vincent to discuss in depth Hitler's Mein Kampf. On 12 December 1987, the church was destroyed by fire, but was reopened on 29 November 1992 after a major renovation. The organ, installed on the platform, was inaugurated on 26 March 1995.

Architecture
Inside, there are 18 cylindrical columns in the nave and large rectangular windows in the dome.

The facade of the church, decorated with a statue of the Virgin Mary and a frieze, was made by Charles Dufraine and has a round arch and two Ionic columns.

References

External links
  Official site

Roman Catholic churches in Lyon
1st arrondissement of Lyon
Churches completed in 1789
1759 establishments in France
Monuments historiques of Lyon